Growing, Pains is the debut album by Billie Myers, released in 1997. In addition to the regular CD, a DTS CD version was released, featuring a 5.1 Surround mix of the entire album and an unplugged version of "Kiss the Rain" as a bonus track.

The bonus track runs 5:00 minutes according to the CD's back cover, but the actual track features ~5 more minutes of a recorded thunderstorm after the song, bringing its entire run time up to 9:55 minutes. Also, the DTS version of "Mother, Daughter, Sister, Lover" is ~30 seconds longer than the stereo version.

Track listing

References

1997 debut albums
Billie Myers albums
Albums produced by Desmond Child